The Lane Baronetcy of Tulske, Roscommon was created in the Baronetage of Ireland 9 February 1661 for Richard Lane.

The Lane Baronetcy, of Cavendish Square in the County of London, was created in the Baronetage of the United Kingdom on 19 June 1913 for Arbuthnot-Lane.

Lane baronets of Tulske, Roscommon (1661)
Sir Richard Lane, 1st Baronet (died 5 October 1668)
George Lane, 1st Viscount Lanesborough (–1683), created Viscount Lanesborough in 1676
James Lane, 2nd Viscount Lanesborough 

On James Lane's death, the baronetcy became extinct, and his estate passed to his great-nephew John Bell—the only grandson of his eldest sister Mary—who then changed his surname to Lane as a condition of the inheritance, thereby becoming John Bell Lane.

Lane baronets, of Cavendish Square (1913)
Sir William Arbuthnot Lane, 1st Baronet (1856–1943)
Sir William Arbuthnot Lane, 2nd Baronet (7 June 1897–1972). He attended Winchester College, worked in a field hospital in France in World War I, and then joined the RFC. He had his own pharmaceutical Company, Kaylene Ltd, founded in 1928. He joined the Special Constabulary in 1926 and between 1951 and 1958 he was Commandant in Chief of the Specials. He was appointed a CBE. He married in Marylebone 29 May 1937, Fritzi Szamvald Markus (born 25 August 1907, died Westminster 2 Dec 1976). He had one daughter. On his death, the baronetcy became extinct.

Notes

References

External links
 

Extinct baronetcies in the Baronetage of Ireland
Extinct baronetcies in the Baronetage of the United Kingdom
1661 establishments in Ireland